The Jurún Marinalá Dam (Spanish: Planta Hidroeléctrica Jurún Marinalá) is a reinforced concrete gravity dam and power plant spanning the Michatoya River in Escuintla, Guatemala.

The dam's reservoir has a total capacity of 112,000 m3. The water is transported to the powerhouse through a 4.03 km long tunnel and a 2.44 km long pressure pipe. The plant has  Pelton turbines, with a total installed capacity of 60 MW. The plant has a net level declination of 660 m, and a designed flow of 4 m/s per unit.

The plant's total power generation between 1970 and 2006 was 6674.91 GWh, which amounts to a mean annual power generation of 185 GWh.

See also

 List of hydroelectric power stations in Guatemala

References

Hydroelectric power stations in Guatemala
Energy infrastructure completed in 1970
Dams in Guatemala
Dams completed in 1970